The 1922 Nebraska gubernatorial election was held on November 7, 1922, and featured former Mayor of Lincoln Charles W. Bryan, a Democrat, defeating Republican nominee, state Senator Charles H. Randall.

Democratic primary

Candidates
Charles W. Bryan, former Mayor of Lincoln and newspaper publisher
Dan B. Butler, Omaha City Commissioner
Will M. Maupin, newspaper publisher and journalist
John N. Norton, former state Representative and Mayor of Osceola

Results

Progressive primary

Candidates
John N. Norton, former state Representative and Mayor of Osceola
W. J. Taylor, state Senator

Results

Nomination
In spite of the primary results, the Nebraska Progressive Party nominated farmer and stockman Harry C. Parmenter on its ticket for Governor.

Republican primary

Candidates
Albert H. Byrum, state Representative
Adam McMullen, former state Senator and Mayor of Wymore
Charles H. Randall, state Senator
George W. Sterling

Results

General election

Results

References

Gubernatorial
1922
Nebraska